The national rugby union teams of Australia (the Wallabies) and Scotland have been playing each other in test rugby since 1927, and by October 2022, they had met in thirty-four test matches. Their first meeting was on 17 December 1927, and was won 10–8 by Scotland. Their most recent meeting took place at Murrayfield Stadium on 29 October 2022, and was won 16–15 by Australia. Scotland won seven of the first nine matches between the sides but then had to wait twenty-seven years until November 2009 for their next victory, as the next sixteen games were all won by Australia. Since 1998, the two teams have competed for the Hopetoun Cup.

Summary

Overall

Records
Note: Date shown in brackets indicates when the record was or last set.

Results

List of series

References

External links

 
Scotland national rugby union team matches
Australia national rugby union team matches
Rugby union rivalries in Australia
Rugby union rivalries in Scotland
Scottish-Australian culture